Gävle Godtemplares IK is a Swedish sports club from Gävle. The club has an ice hockey department, most known for the success the team had during the 1950s, a floorball department, currently, as of 22/23 playing in the Swedish men's top tier SSL, and a football department, currently only supporting youth teams.

History
Gävle Godtemplares IK was founded May 6, 1906, as a gymnastics and athletics club. The club got famous through its ice hockey team, when it made its debut in Sweden's highest ice hockey division for the 1947–48 season. The team reached the finals in the 1953–54 season, but lost to Djurgårdens IF after a 5–1 loss and a 1–1 draw. Gävle GIK got their revenge in the 1956–57 season, when the team won the final series, and their first Le Mat trophy.

The ice hockey team was relegated to the second division after the 1963–64 season, and has since not played in the highest division. The team currently plays in Division 2, which is the fourth tier in the Swedish league system.

References

External links
Gävle GIK Hockey homepage
Gävle GIK Floorball homepage
Gävle GIK Fotboll homepage

Ice hockey teams in Sweden
Sport in Gävle
1906 establishments in Sweden
Ice hockey clubs established in 1906
Association football clubs established in 1906
Ice hockey teams in Gävleborg County